The First Baptist Church, also known as the Old Corner Church, is a historic church at West and Federal Streets in Waterboro, Maine.  Built in 1803-04 and altered to a Greek Revival appearance in 1849, it retains significant characteristics of more traditional Federal period meetinghouses.  The building was listed on the National Register of Historic Places in 1988.

Description and history
The Old Corner Church is located on a rise overlooking the southwest corner of West and Federal Streets, west of the main village of the town of Waterboro. Its Greek Revival features include corner pilasters rising to a broad entablature, and a fully pedimented gable. The main facade faces east, and is symmetrically arranged, with a pair of entrances, each flanked by pilasters and topped by an entablature. At the gallery level there are four sash windows. The side walls each have five triple-hung sash windows, with the pilasters, entablature and water table continued from the front.

The entrances lead into a narrow vestibule area, from which two stairs (one now closed off) lead to the gallery.  The interior has rows of bench pews leading to a raised sanctuary area, with additional pews at the sides of the sanctuary.  The sanctuary houses the pulpit, organ, and seating for deacons, with a raised area at the rear set off by an ornate stained woodwork balustrade.

The church was built in 1803-04 for a Baptist congregation organized in 1791.  When built, this building originally had a gallery extending around three sides; this was reduced to a rear gallery when the building received its Greek Revival treatment in 1849.  Despite these stylistic alterations (as well as the addition of a pressed-tin roof around the turn of the 20th century), the building retains a clearer indication of its Federal period roots than other such buildings in the state.  This church was in active use until about 1947; it is still maintained by the local Baptist congregation, and is used for special events.

See also
National Register of Historic Places listings in York County, Maine

References

Baptist churches in Maine
Churches on the National Register of Historic Places in Maine
Churches completed in 1849
19th-century Baptist churches in the United States
Churches in York County, Maine
1804 establishments in Massachusetts
National Register of Historic Places in York County, Maine